Too Soon to Die is a 1953 mystery detective novel by the British writer Henry Wade. It was the sixth in a series of seven novels featuring the character of Inspector Poole, published during the Golden Age of Detective Fiction. It followed a thirteen year gap since the publication of the previous novel Lonely Magdalen.

Synopsis
Colonel Jerrod and his son concoct an ingenious plan as part of an attempt to save their country estate from crippling death duties. After an apparent boating accident the Inland Revenue investigate before Poole, now a Chief Inspector, arrives on the scene

References

Bibliography
 Herbert, Rosemary. Whodunit?: A Who's Who in Crime & Mystery Writing. Oxford University Press, 2003.
 Reilly, John M. Twentieth Century Crime & Mystery Writers. Springer, 2015.

1953 British novels
Novels by Henry Wade
British mystery novels
British crime novels
British detective novels
Constable & Co. books
Novels set in England